The 1965 All-Big Ten Conference football team consists of American football players chosen by various organizations for All-Big Ten Conference teams for the 1965 Big Ten Conference football season. Players receiving All-Big Ten honors in 1965 included six players who were also recognized as consensus All-Americans: Aaron Brown, Jim Grabowski, Bob Griese, Bubba Smith, George Webster, and Bill Yearby.  Eleven players from the 1965 Michigan State Spartans football team received first- or second-team All-Big Ten honors.

Offensive selections

Quarterbacks
Steve Juday, Michigan State (AP-1, UPI-2)
Bob Griese, Purdue (AP-2, UPI-1)

Running backs
Jim Grabowski, Illinois (AP-1, UPI-1 [fb])
Clinton Jones, Michigan State (AP-1, UPI-1 [hb])
Carl Ward, Michigan (AP-1, UPI-1 [hb])
Tom Barrington, Ohio State (AP-2, UPI-2 [hb])
Bob McKelvey, Northwestern (AP-2)
Bob Apisa, Michigan State (AP-2, UPI-2 [fb])
 Ron Rector, Northwestern (UPI-2 [hb])

Ends
Gene Washington, Michigan State (AP-1, UPI-1)
Bob Hadrick, Purdue (AP-1, UPI-2)
Bill Malinchak, Indiana (AP-2)
Cas Banaszek, Northwestern (AP-2)
Jack Clancy, Michigan (UPI-2)

Tackles
Tom Mack, Michigan (AP-1, UPI-1)
Karl Singer, Purdue (AP-1, UPI-1)
Gale Gillingham, Minnesota (AP-2)
Jim Burns, Northwestern (AP-2)
 Jerry West, Michigan State (UPI-2)
 Charles Kines, Michigan (UPI-2)

Guards
John Niland, Iowa (AP-1, UPI-1)
Doug Van Horn, Ohio State (AP-1, UPI-1)
Paul Faust, Minnesota (AP-2, UPI-2)
John Karpinski, Michigan State (AP-2, UPI-2)

Centers
Larry Kaminski, Purdue (AP-1, UPI-2)
 Ray Pryor, Ohio State (UPI-1)
Boris Dmitroff, Michigan State (AP-2)

Defensive selections

Ends
Aaron Brown, Minnesota (AP-1, UPI-1 [offense])
Bubba Smith, Michigan State (AP-1, UPI-1)
 David Long, Iowa (UPI-1)
Bo Batchelder, Illinois (AP-2, UPI-2)
Jim Long, Purdue (AP-2, UPI-2)

Tackles
Bill Yearby, Michigan (AP-1, UPI-1)
Jerry Shay, Purdue (AP-1, UPI-1)
Bill Ridder, Ohio State (AP-2)
Gary Eickman, Illinois (AP-2)
 Gale Gillingham, Minnesota (UPI-2)
 William Briggs, Iowa (UPI-2)

Guards
 Harold Lucas, Michigan State (AP-2 [lb], UPI-1)
 William Ridder, Ohio State (UPI-2)

Linebackers
Dwight Kelly, Ohio State (AP-1, UPI-1)
Don Hansen, Illinois (AP-1, UPI-1)
Ron Goovert, Michigan State (AP-1, UPI-2)
Jack Calcaterra, Purdue (AP-2)
Tom Cecchini, Michigan (AP-2, UPI-2)
 Dan Hilsabeck, Iowa (UPI-2)

Defensive backs
Rich Volk, Michigan (AP-1, UPI-1 [s])
Ron Acks, Illinois (AP-1, UPI-2 [hb])
John Fill, Ohio State (AP-1)
George Webster, Michigan State (AP-1, UPI-1 [lb])
Don Japinga, Michigan State (AP-2, UPI-1 [hb])
 Charles King, Purdue (UPI-1 [hb])
John Charles, Purdue (AP-2, UPI-2 [hb])
Tom Sakal, Minnesota (AP-2)
Tom Brigham, Wisconsin (AP-2)
 Mike Buckner, Northwestern (UPI-2 [s])

Key
AP = Associated Press

UPI = United Press International

See also
1965 College Football All-America Team

References

All-Big Ten Conference
All-Big Ten Conference football teams